This is a list of the Ghana national football team results from 2010 to the present day.

2010

2011

2012

2013

2014

2015

2016

2017

2018

2019 

2010s
2010s in Ghana
Football in Ghana